Rocky Plain is a rural locality in the Mid North region of South Australia, situated in the Regional Council of Goyder. It was established in August 2000, when boundaries were formalised for the "long established local name".

Rocky Plain School opened in 1923, and reached its highest number of students, 23, in 1934. Numbers subsequently declined, and the school closed on 13 March 1943, with the building later demolished.

Rocky Plain has been described as "only a district name", with the "only notable centre to mark the area" being the now-demolished former school.

References

Towns in South Australia
Mid North (South Australia)